Cartersville High School is a public high school in Cartersville, Georgia. Cartersville is a part of the Cartersville City School System. It was established in 1924 and teaches grades 9 to 12.

History
Cartersville High School opened in 1924. The high school newspaper, "The Chipper" began publication in 1937 and continues until this day.

Athletics

Teams
Carterville's athletic teams are nicknamed the Hurricanes and the school's colors are purple and gold. Cartersville teams compete in the following sports:

Baseball
Basketball
Cross country
Football 
Golf
Gymnastics
Marching band
Soccer
Softball
Swimming
Tennis
Track and field
Volleyball
Wrestling

State championships
Baseball
 2001 AA
 2002 AA
 2003 AAA
 2008 AAA
 2009 AAA
 2013 AAA

Cross-country (men's)
 1993 AA
 1994 AA
 2000 AA
 2001 AA

Football
1991 Georgia 2A State Champions
1999 Georgia 2A State Champions
2015 Georgia 4A State Champions
2016 Georgia 4A State Champions

Notable alumni

 Ronnie Brown - former NFL running back, second overall draft pick.
 Andre Fluellen - former NFL defensive lineman
 Miller Forristall - professional NFL tight end, Cleveland Browns
 Joe Frank Harris - 78th Governor of the State of Georgia
 Keith Henderson - former NFL running back
 Sam Howard - baseball pitcher for the Pittsburgh Pirates
 Robert Lavette - former NFL running back
 Trevor Lawrence - professional NFL quarterback, first overall 2021 NFL Draft pick, Jacksonville Jaguars
 Russ Mitchell - former MLB third baseman
 Anthony Seigler - baseball catcher in the New York Yankees organization, 2018 first round draft pick
 Donavan Tate - former baseball player in the San Diego Padres organization, third overall pick of the 2009 MLB Draft

References

External links
 

Public high schools in Georgia (U.S. state)
Schools in Bartow County, Georgia
Educational institutions established in 1953
1953 establishments in Georgia (U.S. state)